Spire Global, Inc. is a space-to-cloud data and analytics company that specializes in the tracking of global data sets powered by a large constellation of nanosatellites, such as the tracking of maritime, aviation and weather patterns.

The company currently operates a fleet of more than 110 CubeSats, the second largest commercial constellation by number of satellites, and the largest by number of sensors. The satellites are integrally designed and built in-house. It has launched more than 140 satellites to orbit since its creation.

The company has offices in San Francisco, Boulder, Washington DC, Glasgow, Luxembourg, Singapore, and Cambridge (Ontario).

History

Early Years

Spire was originally known as NanoSatisfi Inc. NanoSatisfi was founded in June 2012 in San Francisco by International Space University graduates Peter Platzer, Jeroen Cappaert and Joel Spark as part of ArduSat, a project aiming to “democratize access to space”. Tests for early prototypes were conducted over the summer and the fall through a high-altitude balloon. This effort was partly financed through crowdfunding, with a KickStarter that raised Spire $106,330. In November the company signed an agreement with NanoRacks for the deployment of two satellites in what was to become “the first U.S. Commercial Satellite Deployment from the International Space Station”.

In order to raise the capital required for the manufacturing of those satellites, the company incubated with Lemnos Labs. It raised investments totaling $1.5M in a seed round by Shasta Ventures, Lemnos Labs, E-merge, Grishin Robotics, and Beamonte Investments in February 2013. A year after signing with NanoRacks, on November 19, 2013, both ArduSat-1 and ArduSat-X (1U CubeSats) were successfully released from the Kibo Experiment Module of the International Space Station and quickly started transmitting data to Spire servers.

Following this experimentation, Spire engineers opted to focus on 3U nanosatellites to start porting more complex payloads, launching the first iteration of its standard satellite format, Lemur-1, with the Dnepr rocket in June 2014, transiting from 1U to 3U in only seven months, and launching its first prototype just two years after incorporation.

On the basis of this early success, Spire announced in July a follow-up $25M Series A funding round led by Will Porteous from RRE Ventures and backed by Emerge, Mitsui & Co. Global Investment, and Mousse Partners Capital. The following month, the company announced that ArduSat would be spun-off of the company and would focus exclusively on educational technology in partnership with U.S. high schools. Shortly after, Spire opened its Singapore office in late 2014 and started steadily increasing its network of ground stations.

Growth

On June 30, 2015, the company announced a $40 Million Series B led by Promus Ventures with participation from Bessemer Venture Partners and Jump Capital. in order to help finance the first batches of Lemur satellites. The first Lemur-2 were launched in September 2015 through the Polar Satellite Launch Vehicle-XL, making Spire the first US-based operator to launch from India. This launch inaugurated the Spire tradition to leave the naming of each satellite to employees, with the first 3 Lemurs christened respectively Joel, Peter and Jeroen after the company's co-founders.

Facing increasing pressure to mass-produce satellites and constrained by the limited space in its San Francisco office, Spire opened an office in Glasgow in February 2015, initially leveraging Clyde Space's facilities, before opening its own full-fledged cleanroom for satellite manufacturing in December 2015. The city was chosen to leverage the local know-how of what is widely considered the leading European ecosystem in small satellite production and establish a first foothold in Europe. These facilities enabled Spire to quickly produce a first batch of four nanosatellites (launched in September) before manufacturing a full eight Lemur satellites ahead of an Atlas V launch in March 2016. This launch saw Spire cross the line of 10 simultaneously operating satellites in June of that year, following deployment from the ISS. Two additional launches were conducted that year, putting the total satellites sent to space by the company that year at sixteen, confirming its ability to industrialize the manufacturing process of its nanosatellites.

Concomitantly, Spire opened a second U.S. campus in Boulder, Colorado in January 2016. The company hired Dave Ector – the former program manager for NASA’s COSMIC satellites – and Alexander MacDonald – former director of NOAA’s Earth System Research Laboratory – and started drawing on the resources of the local weather ecosystem (powered by the University of Colorado Boulder) to kickstart its weather program in the city. To this effect, the team started working on Spire's own Global Navigation Satellite System Radio Occultation (GNSS-RO) payload, enabling the company to constantly collect highly accurate data on local atmospheric properties which greatly enhance the forecasting abilities of weather models. This program quickly enabled Spire to participate in the inaugural Commercial Weather Data Pilot program of the U.S. National Oceanographic and Atmospheric Administration in September 2016. Spire's participation was confirmed and broadened in September 2018 for the second round of the CWDP program. This program aims to enable weather-focused administrations to procure data (largely obtained from Radio Occultation profiles) created by private entities in order to improve the precision of the publicly available weather models.

Over 2017, the company launched 6 missions, yielding an additional 36 operated satellites despite the critical failure of a Soyuz vehicle carrying 10 Lemurs in November. Spire closed the year by completing a $70m Series C led by the Government of Luxembourg (through its national Luxembourg Future Fund), and opened its second European campus in the city, enabling the company's access to regional talent and facilities.  This round put the total amount of capital raised by Spire at $140.5m.

In early 2018, Spire participated in the second flight of Rocket Lab’s Electron rocket, and was selected for Arianespace’s Vega Proof of Concept, further broadening its launch portfolio. It participated in a total of 7 launch missions – yielding 28 new operated satellites – and developed its own ADS-B payload able to track the movement of equipped airplanes across areas that conventional ground radars can not cover, and that is quickly becoming a standard following the MH370 disappearance.

In 2019, the company formalized its first business unit as Spire Maritime, based in Luxembourg, and launched its 100th Lemur satellite on April 1st.

On March 1, 2021, the company announced an agreement to go public via a merger with the SPAC (special-purpose acquisition company) Navsight. The merger, completed in the third quarter of 2021, valued the company at $1.6 billion.

Spire's stock began trading in New York stock exchange on August 17, 2021. Spire had a market value of $1.6 billion and about $265 million in cash on its books after the close of the SPAC merger. In the year before, 2020, Spire had booked $36 million in revenue. Also at the time of stock market debut, the company had more than 110 satellites in orbit and ground stations in 16 countries, with more than 70 antennas on its ground stations. At the time, Spire did not expect to grow its constellation of Lemur satellites, as the company did not see “any customer demand” that would require a larger constellation of satellites. Despite not growing its constellation, Spire would continue to build and launch satellites as the Lemur satellites are refreshed on a three-year hardware replacement cycle. When listing in the stock exchange Spire had offices in four countries: the U.S., the U.K., Luxembourg and Singapore and customers in nearly 30 countries.

Due to missing projected revenue targets and rising losses, Spire's market value started falling after the first quarterly report. As of April 30, 2022, the company had a market cap of $231 million, less than half of the $557 million in capital invested in the company, and less than the cash on its books after the close of the SPAC merger.

Satellite 

Spire's Lemur satellites are flexible platforms built to operate a variety of in-house or hosted payloads. It currently commercializes its platform on a “Space-as-a-Service” offering with aerospace and defence customers.

Spire designs, builds, tests, and operates all its satellites in-house at its Glasgow offices. The company uses minimally adapted COTS electronics to reduce cost. The satellites are placed in low Earth orbit and are scheduled to be retired and replaced every two to three years.

Spire adheres to internationally recognized guidelines for disposal of old satellites.

The company's satellites are multi-sensor. Data types such as Automatic Identification System (AIS) service are used for tracking sea vessels. This data is valuable for use in illegal fishing, trade monitoring, maritime domain awareness, insurance, asset tracking, search and rescue, and prevention of piracy, among others. Spire's Sense product leveraging the company's AIS data set was officially launched in February 2019.

The GNSS-RO weather payload measure temperature, pressure, among other key characteristics across a “slice” of the atmosphere, or "profile". These characteristics are highly valuable for public and private weather forecasters across the world as they strongly increase the forecasting capabilities of weather models.

ADS-B sensors were launched in 2018 to permanently track aircraft across all skies. This data is getting increasingly regarded as the new standard for modern aviation as it enables air controllers and companies to constantly monitor aircraft across isolated areas and oceans which ground-based radars are not able to cover.

In 2020, Spire announced its intention to add intersatellite links to its satellites, allowing for lower latency between data collection and delivery to a gateway site.

See also 
 Planet Labs
 Kepler Communications

References

External links 
 

Companies based in San Francisco
Companies listed on the New York Stock Exchange
Aerospace companies of the United States

Commercial Earth observation satellites